Karl Marx (1818–1883) was a German philosopher, economist and founder of Marxism.

Marx may also refer to:


People
Marx (surname), people named Marx

Places
 Marx Memorial Library, London
 Marks, Russia, a town in Russia (also spelled Marx)

Other uses
 Louis Marx and Company, an American toy manufacturing company
 Marx (Kirby), a character from the Kirby series of video games

See also
 Marx generator, an electrical circuit which produces high-voltage pulses
 St. Marx cemetery, Landstraße, Vienna